Unearthly Stranger is a 1963 British science fiction film directed by John Krish and starring John Neville. It was released in the UK by Independent Artists (Production) Limited.

The film was written by Rex Carlton based on an idea by Jeffrey Stone. Its US release was in April 1964.

Plot 
Dr. Mark Davidson (John Neville), the narrator, is in fear for his life. His predecessor died under mysterious circumstances just after making a major breakthrough. The cause of death ("an explosion inside his brain") is being withheld by Secret Service agent Major Clarke (Patrick Newell). The scientists are working on a project involving spaceflight by the power of mental concentration.

Dr. Mark Davidson has a new Swiss wife, Julie (played by Gabriella Licudi), in whom Maj. Clarke takes an interest. Julie has a number of unusual characteristics, such as sleeping with her eyes open, never blinking and having no pulse, which makes her husband suspect she is an alien. She also frightens children and can handle very hot objects with her bare hands. After frightening a whole schoolyard of children, though, it emerges she can cry, though the tears burn her cheeks. Maj. Clarke does a background check and finds she never existed before her life with the doctor. As a precaution, Dr. Mark Davidson is relieved of his lab duties. With nothing else to do he works on the problem his precessor had figured out. He is able to recover the lost formula. For security reasons, Maj. Clarke confiscates the notes but is struck dead in the same mysterious way.

Eventually, Julie confesses that she is an alien sent to kill her husband and that she must leave because she has failed, as she has fallen in love with him. Despite his pleas, she vanishes, leaving only an empty dress. He rushes into his office and makes the tape which narrates the film, warning that aliens want to prevent the breakthrough. He is then interrupted by his secretary, who announces she is also an alien and she is there to finish the assignment. A scuffle ensues and, her concentration threatened, she falls backwards out of a window but only an empty dress lands on the pavement. The scientists rush downstairs and are quietly surrounded by a crowd of grim-visaged women, all of whom seem to be aliens.

Cast 
 John Neville as Dr. Mark Davidson
 Philip Stone as Prof. John Lancaster
 Gabriella Licudi as Julie Davidson
 Patrick Newell as Maj. Clarke
 Jean Marsh as Miss Ballard
 Warren Mitchell as Prof. Geoffrey D. Munro

Critical reception
Unearthly Stranger was selected by the film historians Steve Chibnall and Brian McFarlane as one of the 15 most meritorious British B films made between World War II and 1970. "Although Unearthly Stranger appears to draw attention to the performance of femininity, it is male society that is the real object of scrutiny," they say, describing it as "a highly effective fable" and praising its "unsettling atmosphere of dislocation and tension which disturbs our taken-for-granted assumptions about the worlds of office and home".

References

External links 
 
 Unearthly Stranger at British Horror Films 
Unearthly Stranger at BFI Screenonline

1963 films
British science fiction films
1960s science fiction films
Films directed by John Krish
1960s English-language films
1960s British films